The Linn Shuttle bus system serves the Sweet Home and Linn County, Oregon area. It operates a fixed-route shuttle service around Sweet Home, serving Sweet Home, Albany, and Lebanon in Linn County. The shuttle also connects to Albany Transit, Linn-Benton Loop, Corvallis Transit, Greyhound and Amtrak.

In 2015, the Linn Shuttle added two Blue Bird Vision Propane buses to its fleet, used primarily on the main Linn Shuttle route. The Linn Shuttle also uses 2013 Freightliner buses. The Linn Shuttle still uses a Chevrolet bus and a Ford bus as back-up buses.

References

Transportation in Linn County, Oregon
Bus transportation in Oregon